Hafsa Mossi (1964 – 13 July 2016) was a Burundian politician, journalist, and member of President Pierre Nkurunziza's ruling CNDD–FDD political party. Mossi served as Minister of Information, Communications and Government Spokesperson from 2005 to 2007, as well as Minister of Regional Integration from 2009 to 2011, in Nkurunziza's Council of Ministers. She then served as a member of the East African Legislative Assembly (EALA), representing Burundi, from 12 June 2012, until her murder on 13 July 2016. Her current term in the EALA would have expired in 2017.

Mossi was born in 1964 in Makamba. An ethnic Hutu, she began her career in journalism at the Channel for Africa in South Africa. In 1998, Mossi moved to London and became a journalist and producer for the British Broadcasting Corporation's (BBC) Swahili service. She returned to Burundi in the mid-2000s.

Mossi, who was in her 50s, was shot and killed while leaving her home in the Gihosha commune of the then-capital, Bujumbura, on 13 July 2016, by two gunmen who escaped in a car. President Pierre Nkurunziza called her murder an assassination. Several high-ranking members of the Military of Burundi had been killed in the country since the beginning of the Burundian unrest in April 2015. However, Hafsa Mossi was the first senior politician to be killed during the ongoing political crisis. Observers were puzzled by the motive behind Mossi's murder, since she was not viewed as a CNDD–FDD hardliner or stalwart.

References

Date of birth missing
1964 births
2016 deaths
Government ministers of Burundi
Burundian journalists
Burundian women journalists
BBC newsreaders and journalists
Members of the East African Legislative Assembly
National Council for the Defense of Democracy – Forces for the Defense of Democracy politicians
People from Makamba Province
Hutu people
Assassinated Burundian politicians
Burundian expatriates in South Africa
Burundian expatriates in the United Kingdom
Women government ministers of Burundi
Deaths by firearm in Burundi
Burundian radio presenters
Burundian women radio presenters